Let's Face the Music and Dance is the 61st studio album by American country singer-songwriter Willie Nelson. Nelson's second album under his contract with Legacy Recordings, it was released on April 16, 2013. The album produced by Buddy Cannon featured a collection of standards that Nelson and his sister Bobbie played throughout their careers.

Recording
Composed of pop, jazz, rock, and country music standards, the set also included a new version of Nelson's original "Is the Better Part Over" from his 1989 album A Horse Called Music. The album was recorded at Nelson's Pedernales studio in Austin, Texas, was produced by Buddy Cannon and later mixed by Butch Carr at Budro Music Repair Shop in Nashville, Tennessee. The album focuses in his musical relation with his sister, Bobbie, as the standards were played by them during their childhood and throughout their musical career.

Release and reception
The second album by Nelson under his contract with Legacy Recordings, it was released on April 16, 2013.

Allmusic rated the album with three stars out of five, Stephen Thomas Erlewine praised the musicality, describing Nelson and The Family's sound as "one seamless unit". The Austin Chronicle also rated the album with three stars out of five, and referred to Nelson's upcoming birthday, calling it "An exquisitely contemplative turn into 80".

Meanwhile, Exclaim! praised Nelson's guitar playing and described the band as a "small combo playing songs as timeless as (Nelson's) wonderfully idiosyncratic voice". Daily Record also favored his guitar playing as well as voice, also remarking Nelson's tendence to feature covers, instead of original songwriting in his recent recordings. Popmatters rated the album with seven stars out of ten. The review praised Nelson's coordination with the band, describing the record as "a welcome effort; it’s comfortable, graceful, and uniformly pleasant".

Track listing

Personnel
Willie Nelson - acoustic guitar, lead vocals
 Jim "Moose" Brown - Hammond B-3 organ
 Paul English - snare drums, gut string guitar
 Bobbie Nelson - piano
 Micah Nelson - charango, percussion
 Mickey Raphael - harmonica
 Kevin Smith - upright bass

Charts

References

Willie Nelson albums
2013 albums
Sony Music albums
Albums produced by Buddy Cannon
Traditional pop albums